Gleanings from the Writings of Baháʼu'lláh is a compilation of selected tablets and extracts from tablets by Baháʼu'lláh, the founder of the Baháʼí Faith. Shoghi Effendi, Guardian of the Baháʼí Faith from 1921 to 1957, made the selection and performed the translation, which was first published in 1935.

The work consists of "a selection of the most characteristic and hitherto unpublished passages from the outstanding works of the Author of the Baháʼí Revelation," according to Shoghi Effendi.
The "Day of God" (sec. 1-18) 
The Manifestation of God (sec. 19-69)
The soul and its immortality (sec. 70-99)
The World Order and the Most Great Peace (sec. 100-121)
The duties of the individual and the spiritual meaning of life (sec. 122-166)

Among others, passages from the following works are included:
Epistle to the Son of the Wolf
The Hidden Words
The Kitáb-i-Aqdas
The Kitáb-i-Íqán

In addition, works partially translated in Gleanings were published more completely in the following compilations:
The Summons of the Lord of Hosts
The Tabernacle of Unity
Tablets of Baháʼu'lláh Revealed After the Kitáb-i-Aqdas

The book was published without a list of which passages were derived from which works of Baháʼu'lláh, but such a list has been reconstructed subsequently and is on the web.

Because of its broad selection, Gleanings is one of the first works of Baháʼu'lláh many people read. Rúḥíyyih Rabbání, Shoghi Effendi's widow, called it "a magnificent gift" to the Western Baháʼís. Queen Marie of Romania wrote that "even doubters would find a powerful strength in it, if they would read it alone, and would give their souls time to expand." The work has been translated into many languages.

Notes

References

Further reading
 Related documents on Baháʼí Library Online

External links
A compendium on Gleanings from the Writings of Baha'u'llah
The Gleanings in many languages (incl. bilingual view)
Muntakhabátí-az-Áthár-i-Ḥaḍrat-i-Bahá’u’lláh (Persian/Arabic edition on bahai.org)

Works by Baháʼu'lláh
Essay collections